KTNT is a radio station airing a country music format licensed to Eufaula, Oklahoma, broadcasting on 102.5 MHz FM.  The station serves the areas of Eufaula and McAlester, Oklahoma, and is owned by K95.5, Inc.

History of call letters
The call letters KTNT-FM were previously assigned to a station in Tacoma, Washington. Owned by the Tribune Publishing Company, it began broadcasting October 26, 1948, on 97.3 MHz.
The KTNT call sign was also used during the mid 1980s by Walton Stations, New Mexico for a station in Ruidoso, New Mexico.

FM translator

References

External links
KTNT's official website
blakefm102.5 facebook

Country radio stations in the United States
TNT